Trevor Boys (November 3, 1957 – February 2, 2023) was a Canadian race car driver. He raced in 102 Winston Cup races from 1982 to 1993, posting two top-ten finishes, and ran six races in the Craftsman Truck Series in 2003, his best finish a 22nd at Memphis Motorsports Park.

In October 2006, he attempted to start racing again with a team called H&K Motorsports. H&K Motorsports was a co-owned business with Eddie Kucharski. Boys made two NASCAR Busch Series starts in 2007, both for Randy MacDonald. He started 40th at Milwaukee and finished nine laps down in 29th. His final NASCAR start was at the race in Montreal at the Circuit Gilles Villeneuve. He started 41st and finished 35th with transmission troubles on the road course.

Boys died on February 2, 2023, at the age of 65.

Motorsports career results

NASCAR

(key) (Bold – Pole position awarded by qualifying time. Italics – Pole position earned by points standings or practice time. * – Most laps led.)

Sprint Cup Series

Daytona 500

Nationwide Series

Camping World Truck Series

ARCA Hooters SuperCar Series

(key) (Bold – Pole position awarded by qualifying time. Italics – Pole position earned by points standings or practice time. * – Most laps led.)

References

External links

 Official website
 
 
 

1957 births
2023 deaths
Racing drivers from Alberta
American Speed Association drivers
ARCA Menards Series drivers
NASCAR drivers
NASCAR team owners
NASCAR crew chiefs
Sportspeople from Calgary